Eduard Krüger (24 March 1893 – 5 November 1963) was a German equestrian. He competed in two events at the 1928 Summer Olympics.

References

1893 births
1963 deaths
German male equestrians
Olympic equestrians of Germany
Equestrians at the 1928 Summer Olympics
Sportspeople from Metz